Gareth Matthew (born 18 February 1984) is a Kittitian cricketer. He played in four first-class matches for the Leeward Islands in 2002/03.

See also
 List of Leeward Islands first-class cricketers

References

External links
 

1984 births
Living people
Kittitian cricketers
Leeward Islands cricketers